Rune B. Johansson (1915–1982) was a Swedish politician who was a member of the Social Democratic Party. He served as minister of the interior (1957–1962) and minister of industry (1971–1976).

Biography
Johansson was born in Ljungby in 1915. He joined the youth movement of the Social Democratic Party and then, became part of the county council. He was the minister of the interior between 1957 and 1962 in the cabinet led by Tage Erlander. He also served as the minister of industry from 1971 to 1976. He was the coauthor of a book entitled SABO-företagen i den nya bostadspolitiken which was published in 1967. He died in 1982.

References

20th-century Swedish politicians
1915 births
1982 deaths
Interior ministers of Sweden
Swedish Social Democratic Party politicians